Jaroslav Burgr (7 March 1906, in Velké Přítočno – 15 September 1986) was a Czech football defender. He played for Czechoslovakia.

He was a participant in two World Cups, in 1934 and 1938. He played 57 matches for the national team.

Burgr played domestic football mostly for AC Sparta Prague.

References

External links 
 
 Biography at spartaforever.cz 

1906 births
1986 deaths
Czech footballers
Czechoslovak footballers
Association football defenders
1934 FIFA World Cup players
1938 FIFA World Cup players
AC Sparta Prague players
FK Baník Most players
Czechoslovakia international footballers
People from Kladno District
People from the Kingdom of Bohemia
Sportspeople from the Central Bohemian Region